Rajesh Chauhan (born 19 December 1966) is a former Indian cricketer who played in 21 Tests and 35 One Day Internationals from 1993 to 1998. He was part of the Indian spin trio of Kumble (Leg break) -Raju (Left arm orthodox)-Chauhan (Off break), in the 1990s.

Although his own contributions were only of limited value, India lost none of the 21 Tests in which he played. The record, for which he is perhaps remembered most for his last-over six off Saqlain Mushtaq at Karachi in 1997, which sealed a four-wicket win for India against Pakistan.

Early life
His father Govind Raja Chauhan, who lived in Ranchi, was also a cricketer and played Ranji Trophy in 1957 & Duleep Trophy in 1964. Their ancestral village is Vidi in Kutch and he belongs to a small community known as Kutch Gurjar Kshatriya. Rajesh also served as Chairman of All-India Youth Wing of Kutch Gurjar Kshatriya community for years 1993–96 and is an active social member of the community.

Later life
In April 2007 he was seriously injured in a car accident. He suffered multiple fractures as well as bruising on his leg, back, hand and head. He currently resides in Bhilai - Chhattisgarh running a business. He is now Professional in Bhilai Steel Plant.
On 7 July 2014 suffered a massive cardiac arrest at his residence in Bhilai, however, survived.

References

1966 births
Living people
India Test cricketers
India One Day International cricketers
Indian cricketers
Central Zone cricketers
Madhya Pradesh cricketers
People from Ranchi
People from Kutch district
People from Bhilai
Gujarati people
Gujarati sportspeople
Cricketers from Bihar